Kenai Municipal Airport  is a city-owned, public-use airport located in Kenai, a city in the Kenai Peninsula Borough of the U.S. state of Alaska.

As per Federal Aviation Administration records, the airport had 96,565 passenger boardings (enplanements) in calendar year 2008, 82,277 enplanements in 2009, and 86,857 in 2010. It is included in the National Plan of Integrated Airport Systems for 2011–2015, which categorized it as a primary commercial service airport (more than 10,000 enplanements per year).

Facilities and aircraft
Kenai Municipal Airport covers an area of 1,200 acres (486 ha) at an elevation of 99 feet (30 m) above mean sea level. It has two runways: 2L/20R with a 7,855 by 150 feet (2,394 x 46 m) asphalt pavement and 2R/20L with a 1980 by 75 feet (604 x 23 m) gravel surface. It also has a seaplane landing area designated 2W/20W which measures 4,600 by 252 feet (1,402 x 77 m). In addition, the airport has two asphalt helipads that are 100 by 100 feet (30 x 30 m).

For the 12-month period ending December 1, 2011, the airport had 40,178 aircraft operations, an average of 110 per day: 58% air taxi, 32% general aviation, 8% military, and 3% scheduled commercial. At that time there were 61 aircraft based at this airport: 88.5% single-engine and 11.5% multi-engine.

Airlines and destinations

The following airlines offer scheduled passenger service:

Statistics

Historical airline jet service

During the late 1970s and early 1980s, the airport had scheduled passenger jet service to Seattle (SEA).  In 1979, Wien Air Alaska was operating nonstop flights to Seattle three days a week with Boeing 737-200 jetliners.  By 1981, Wien Air Alaska was flying daily direct Boeing 737-200 service to Seattle via an intermediate stop in Anchorage (ANC).  Wien then discontinued jet service into the airport and by 1984 was only flying nonstop service to Anchorage with all flights operated with commuter turboprop aircraft.

History
The airport was initially constructed by the US Army under Air Navigation Site Withdrawal No. 156 in 1941 with a 5,000' runway completed by the Civil Air Patrol in 1942. The first terminal building was constructed in 1952, north of the highway spur next to the cemetery.

During the Korean War era the US Air Force maintained jet fighters at the airport and provided maintenance via an agreement with the FAA. The USAF agreement ended in 1962, but the Air Force still retains four airport-adjacent tracts of land.

In 1963 2,000 acres encompassing the airport and lands were transferred to the City of Kenai by the FAA. The current terminal was built in 1966, with some remodeling in the '80s.

In 1973 an FAA control tower was added for increased safety and to permit additional equipment to use the facility.

In 1984 commercial flights to Seattle ended. Currently only commuter flights to Anchorage are scheduled.

The last large commercial jetliner landed in March, 2014, when a massive snow storm completely closed Anchorage International causing United Airlines Flight 1425 (a Boeing 737) from Chicago to be diverted to Kenai, staying overnight to allow the pilots to complete mandatory rest.

References

External links
 Kenai Municipal Airport, official website
 FAA Alaska airport diagram (GIF)
 Topographic map from USGS The National Map
 
 

 https://www.airnav.com/airport/PAEN

Airports in Kenai Peninsula Borough, Alaska